Highway 98 is the primary north-south highway in the Golan Heights. It is shaped like an archer's bow, and it runs parallel to the ceasefire line with Syria.  The route runs from Tzemah junction south of the Kinneret, first through the Yarmuk valley, then it rises up a steep slope into the Golan Heights and crosses it until it reaches the lowest cable-car station on Mount Hermon. There it meets Route 999. Highway 98 is steep compared to the other highways in Israel, rising from 210 meters below sea level at the Kinneret to 1600 meters above sea level on the Hermon.

Places of interest near Highway 98
 The Kinneret
 Hamat Gader
 Metzukei HaOn Nature Reserve
 Meitzar Stream
 El Al Nature Reserve
 Iris grand-dufii reserve
 Hushniyya iris reserve
 Bashanit Range reserve
 A view into Kuneitra across the ceasefire line
 Mount Avital reserve
 Hermonit reserve
 Valley of Tears
 Odem Forest
 Berekhat Ram
 Sa'ar Stream
 Mount Hermon

See also 
 List of highways in Israel

Roads in Israel
Roads in Israeli-occupied territories